Jajang Mulyana (born 23 October 1988 in Sumedang) is an Indonesian professional footballer who plays as a centre-back for Liga 1 club Bali United.

International career
In 2007, Jajang represented the Indonesia U-23, in the 2007 Southeast Asian Games.

Honours

Club
Pelita Jaya U-21
 Indonesia Super League U-21: 2008-09
Bhayangkara
 Liga 1: 2017

References

External links 
 
 Jajang Mulyana at Liga Indonesia

1988 births
Living people
Sundanese people
People from Sumedang
Sportspeople from West Java
Indonesian footballers
Indonesian expatriate footballers
Expatriate footballers in Brazil
Boavista Sport Club players
Liga 1 (Indonesia) players
Liga 2 (Indonesia) players
Pelita Jaya FC players
Sriwijaya F.C. players
Borneo F.C. players
Dewa United F.C. players
Bhayangkara F.C. players
Bali United F.C. players
Mitra Kukar players
Association football defenders
Footballers at the 2006 Asian Games
Asian Games competitors for Indonesia